Michael Frech (born 26 March 1976) is a German former footballer who played as a goalkeeper.

Career
Frech made his 3. Liga debut for Holstein Kiel on 25 July 2009, starting in the away match against Jahn Regensburg, which finished as a 0–2 loss.

References

External links
 Profile at DFB.de
 Profile at kicker.de

1976 births
Living people
People from Flensburg
Footballers from Schleswig-Holstein
German footballers
Association football goalkeepers
Hamburger SV II players
VfB Lübeck players
Sportfreunde Siegen players
Holstein Kiel players
3. Liga players
Regionalliga players